Oscar dos Santos Emboaba Júnior (born 9 September 1991), known mononymously as Oscar, is a Brazilian professional footballer who plays an attacking midfielder for Chinese Super League club Shanghai Port.

Oscar began his career at São Paulo, and in 2009, he went to court against the club due to irregularities in his contract. After a series of controversies, he left for Internacional, where he spent the next three years of his career. His displays for club and country led to him signing for Chelsea for a fee of R$61.575 million. After four-and-a-half years with Chelsea, he signed for Chinese Super League side then known as Shanghai SIPG for an Asian transfer record £67 million in January 2017.

He is a Brazilian international and has represented his country at the under-20 level, at the 2012 London Olympics and at senior level. On 20 August 2011, Oscar scored three goals in the 2011 FIFA U-20 World Cup final win against Portugal, becoming the first player to score a hat-trick in the FIFA U-20 World Cup final. Oscar later described his performances at the tournament as being a "gateway to the senior side." His playing style and ability have drawn comparison to compatriot Kaká. He made his senior debut for Brazil in 2011 and was a member of the team that won the 2013 FIFA Confederations Cup and that finished fourth at the 2014 FIFA World Cup, both on home soil.

Club career

Early career

Born in Americana, Oscar came through the youth academy at União Barbarense and impressed from an early age. Oscar was spotted by talent scouts who took him to the state capital where he subsequently joined São Paulo in 2004 at the age of 13.

He made his professional debut on 28 August 2008, in the second leg of the first stage of the Copa Sudamericana. He played the full 90 minutes of the goalless draw with Atlético Paranaense at the Arena da Baixada, but he and Juninho had their attempts saved by Vinícius in the penalty shootout, eliminating their team. His domestic debut came on 13 March 2009, filling in for Jean for the final eight minutes of a 5–0 home win over Mirassol in the Campeonato Paulista. That year, he also made 11 substitute appearances for the team in the Campeonato Brasileiro Série A.

Internacional
Initially, Oscar joined Internacional after a contractual dispute with his former club São Paulo, with Oscar's agent claiming that the club had not paid salaries as promised. Oscar's representatives argued that his contract with São Paulo was null and void whereupon Oscar joined Internacional as a free agent. São Paulo continued to claim that Oscar belonged to them and lodged legal appeals which prevented Oscar from playing for Internacional in vital Copa Libertadores fixtures. Eventually, a settlement was agreed upon between São Paulo and Internacional on 30 May 2012, severing his contract for a fee of €6 million.

Oscar's first season at Internacional was blighted by injury. On 23 February 2011, as an 80th-minute substitute for Leandro Damião, he scored his first goal for the club to conclude a 4–0 home win over Jaguares de Chiapas at the start of Inter's defence of the Copa Libertadores. He added two more goals in the competition before their elimination in the last 16 by Peñarol. His first goals in domestic football came on 5 June, a brace in a 4–2 win over América-MG in the third game of the Série A season; he finished the season with 10 goals from 26 games.

Chelsea
On 16 July 2012, Chelsea agreed on a fee of R$61.575 million for Oscar. (according to several media, the fee was estimated for £19 million or £25 million) On 25 July, Chelsea announced the signing of Oscar on a five-year contract. On 19 August 2012, Oscar made his debut for Chelsea by coming on in the 64th minute for fellow debutant, Eden Hazard in their opening game of the 2012–13 season against Wigan Athletic.

Oscar made his first start of the season on 19 September in Chelsea's first Champions League match against Juventus. After making the match 1–0 in favour of Chelsea with a deflected effort, he added a second, which curled over Juventus keeper Gianluigi Buffon, to make it 2–0 at Stamford Bridge. However the game ended in a 2–2 draw, but he was awarded Man of the Match. He commented on his second goal, saying, "I am very happy with two goals on my debut but I would have been much happier if the team had won the game. In Brazil, young boys dream of playing in the Champions League and I'm very proud to have realised my dream."

Three days later, Oscar then made his first Premier League start in a 1–0 victory over Stoke City. Following his good performances, Oscar became a regular starter in Roberto Di Matteo's creative midfield triumvirate with Juan Mata and Eden Hazard. He scored his third goal of the season, in the Champions League, in Chelsea's 2–1 away defeat away to Shakhtar Donetsk in Donetsk, and continued his scoring record in Europe by scoring into an open net from 40 yards out in the reverse fixture against Shakhtar at Stamford Bridge, a match which Chelsea won 3–2. Oscar also scored in Europe in ultimately Chelsea's last Champions League fixture, making the score 6–1 for Chelsea against debutants Nordsjælland.

After the sacking of manager Di Matteo on 21 November, interim manager Rafael Benítez only started Oscar three times in his first seven games. Benítez praised Oscar's attitude after dropping him for the FIFA Club World Cup Final against Corinthians and believed there was no rift between himself and the player. He scored his first Premier League goal for the club on 23 December, scoring a penalty during an 8–0 win against Aston Villa.

On 14 February 2013, less than a minute after coming off the bench to replace Mata, Oscar exchanged passes with Hazard before finishing past Tomáš Vaclík, breaking the deadlock and handing Chelsea a 1–0 away victory over Sparta Praha in the first leg of their Europa League Round of 32 clash. On 15 May, Oscar played the full ninety minutes as Chelsea defeated Benfica 2–1 in the Europa League final in Amsterdam, securing his first piece of silverware with the London club. The following day, his goal against Juventus in the Champions League was named the Chelsea "Goal of the Season."

In the first match of the 2013–14 season on 18 August, Oscar scored Chelsea's opening goal in a 2–0 win over Hull City. He opened the scoring against local rivals Fulham in a 2–1 win on 21 September. On 1 January 2014 Oscar put in a match-winning performance against Southampton at St Mary's Stadium, scoring one and assisting two as Chelsea won the match 0–3. However, he was booked in that match for diving. Oscar scored fourth and fifth goals in Chelsea's 6–0 victory over Arsenal on 23 March, which was Arsène Wenger's 1000th match in charge of the club.

Before the start of the 2014–15 season, Oscar's shirt number 11 was given back to the returning Didier Drogba, and he instead took the number 8 vacated by Frank Lampard earlier in the summer. He said "Didier is a Chelsea legend and a senior player. I am happy for him to take the 11 and for me to take the 8. Lamps is another legend at this club and I hope I will be as successful in the shirt as he was." His early season success was rewarded in November as he signed a new contract with the club keeping him with the Blues until the end of the 2018–19 season. Oscar scored twice in the first half of Chelsea's 5–0 away win at Swansea City on 17 January 2015, exploiting a wayward pass by Gylfi Sigurðsson to open the scoring after 50 seconds. On 26 April, he was hospitalised after suffering a head injury following a collision with opposing goalkeeper David Ospina in a 0–0 away draw against Arsenal in the Premier League; he was released the following day.

Oscar scored Chelsea's first goal of the next season in an eventual 2–2 home draw with Swansea, being substituted early in the second half after the dismissal of goalkeeper Thibaut Courtois. On 16 September, he scored a penalty in a 4–0 win over Maccabi Tel Aviv in the first game of the Champions League group stage. He, Diego Costa and Cesc Fàbregas were abused by supporters who believed that the trio's slump in form had cost the job of popular manager José Mourinho; in the first game since his dismissal, on 26 December, Oscar slipped and missed a spot kick in a 2–2 home draw against Watford. The following 31 January, Oscar scored a first-half hat-trick in a 5–1 win at Milton Keynes Dons in the fourth round of the FA Cup.

On 26 October 2016, Oscar made his 200th appearance for Chelsea in a 2–1 League Cup defeat to West Ham United.

Shanghai
On 23 December 2016, Chinese Super League side Shanghai SIPG officially confirmed that the club had agreed on terms with Chelsea for the transfer of Oscar, to be completed during the January transfer window for a reported £67 million. The fee represented an Asian transfer record. Oscar was reported to have signed a four-year contract with a weekly salary of £400,000, equivalent to an annual salary of £20.8 million (US$26.5 million). The contract placed Oscar amongst the highest paid footballers in the world, annually during his 4-year tenure with the club. After signing for Shanghai SIPG, Oscar revealed that various European clubs were interested in signing him but decided to play in China as “China has incredible financial power and sometimes makes offers that players can’t refuse.” He subsequently mentioned that he was more concerned about his family, than of his own career. Furthermore, he added that after completing his contract with Shanghai SIPG, he was interested in returning to Europe as he remained motivated to play football at a high level.

The Brazilian made an immediate impression for his new club, scoring on his friendly debut against Saudi Arabian side Al-Batin. Oscar made his official debut on 7 February 2017 and scored the first goal of a 3–0 win over Thai club Sukhothai in the 2017 AFC Champions League qualifying play-off. On 11 April 2017, Oscar missed two penalty kicks as his team lost 1–0 in an AFC Champions League match against Urawa Red Diamonds. He scored his first domestic league goal for SIPG with a penalty on 21 April 2017 in a 3–0 home win against Hebei China Fortune. In a league match between Shanghai SIPG and Guangzhou R&F on 18 June 2017, Oscar assisted Hulk's equaliser in the 45+1 minute, however, afterwards as the opposition players complained to the referee that Hulk had been offside, Oscar twice purposely kicked the ball into Guangzhou players. In the ensuing brawl, both Li Tixiang and Fu Huan were sent off. Although Oscar himself was not booked for his role, he was later banned for 8 matches and fined 40,000 RMB for his role in starting the incident.

In his second season, Oscar scored 12 goals as Shanghai won the league for the first time. In January 2022, Oscar was linked with a return to Europe and a move to FC Barcelona.

During the summer transfer window 2022 Oscar was denied a move to Brazilian club Clube de Regatas do Flamengo. It was said that Shanghai Port F.C. blocked the move "last-minute". Oscar had taken a photo with a Flamengo shirt on but the transfer collapsed.

International career

Youth

On 20 August 2011, Oscar scored three goals in the 2011 FIFA U-20 World Cup final win against Portugal, becoming the first player to score a hat-trick in the FIFA U-20 World Cup final. This performance was immediately compared to the 1966 hat trick by Geoff Hurst as only the second time a single player scored three goals in a World Cup final match.

2012 Olympics

Oscar was named into the Brazilian squad to compete at the Olympics in London. Oscar starred in Brazil's 3–2 victory over Egypt in the opening game, providing the assists for goals by Rafael and Leandro Damião. In Brazil's next game, a 3–1 victory over Belarus, Oscar netted the Seleção's third goal in injury time, after being played through by Neymar, to send the Brazilians into the quarter-finals. All goals in the Olympics was assisted or scored by Oscar and Neymar, the two prodigies who are both regarded as the exceptional talents coming from Brazil. Oscar provided two assists, one to Rômulo and another for Leandro Damião, as the Seleção defeated South Korea 3–0 in the semi-finals at Old Trafford on 7 August. Brazil went on to lose the gold medal match against Mexico 2–1.

Senior

Oscar was given his first senior call-up as a substitute in a 0–0 draw against Argentina. Due to injuries to the attacking midfielder Ganso, he saw his national team opportunities increase and was even preferred over more experienced playmakers on a number of occasions. In June 2012, Oscar scored his first international goal in a friendly match in New York City against Argentina, which Brazil went on to lose 4–3. He also scored a penalty kick against China as well as recording three assists in the 8–0 rout, before firing a brace against Iraq one month later.

On 25 March 2013 Oscar played against Russia at Stamford Bridge with fellow Chelsea teammates David Luiz and Ramires. He wore the nation's iconic 10 number shirt.

Oscar played and started in all of Brazil's games in the 2013 FIFA Confederations Cup as they beat Spain 3–0 in the final to claim the trophy. He provided the assist for the second goal in the final, scored by Neymar.

In the opening match of the 2014 FIFA World Cup, on 12 June against Croatia in São Paulo, Oscar scored in injury time with a toe-poke from outside the box for the last goal in a 3–1 win.  In Brazil's record-breaking 7–1 semi-final defeat to Germany on 8 July, Oscar scored the only goal for Brazil in the 90th minute. Alongside Thiago Silva, he was one of two Brazilians included in the Team of the Tournament. He also played and started every game.

Due to an injury in training, Oscar was not included in Brazil's squad for the 2015 Copa América in Chile. He was last recalled to the squad in October 2016, for Brazil's qualifiers of the 2018 World Cup qualifiers.

Style of play

Considered to be a highly talented and promising player in his youth, Oscar has drawn comparisons to players such as Mesut Özil and fellow Brazilian teammate Kaká due to his playmaking abilities. A quick, agile, and technically gifted player, with superb dribbling skills and an excellent first touch, Oscar is very fluid and creative in his runs. As an offensive playmaker, Oscar has great vision and is able to deliver precise short passes to his teammates, which enables him to play "killer balls." Oscar is also extremely effective in building up play in areas higher up the pitch. His cunning runs, as well as his skills, range of passing and finishing ability, make him a threat inside or near the opposing penalty area, and allow him to score goals in addition to creating goalscoring opportunities. Although he typically played either as a second striker or in a central attacking midfield position for Internacional, since his transfer to Chelsea, Oscar has been deployed in all three attacking midfield positions behind the central striker, in the centre as well as on either flank. Known for his vision, ability to pick out teammates in tight positions, and carve out chances in difficult situations, Oscar often acted as the catalyst in Chelsea's attacks during his time with the club, and was widely praised for his role in the team's Europa League success in 2013. Under Mourinho, Oscar was used as Chelsea's primary playmaker in midfield. A versatile player, he has also been praised by managers for being capable of playing in wider positions, as well as in his favoured role in the centre of the pitch. Oscar's energy, work-rate, tenacity, and ability to press opponents high up the pitch made him a favorite of his former Chelsea manager Mourinho, and also allowed him to play in deeper midfield positions, or even in a box-to-box role on occasion, in particular during his time with São Paulo and under his former Chelsea manager Antonio Conte. Despite his talent, however, he has accused by certain pundits – such as Nizaar Kinsella of Goal.com – of being inconsistent, and of failing to live up to his potential, in particular during his later Chelsea career, where he struggled to adapt to different systems and retain his place in the team's starting line-up.

Personal life
Oscar's father was killed in a traffic accident in 1994. At the time, Oscar's mother was pregnant with his sister, Gabriela. Oscar said that while growing up, he remembered little of his father and wished his dad could have watched him play football during his childhood. Oscar also said he grew up in poverty and that his family had nothing. Oscar attributed his footballing success to his mother Sueli, who raised three children (including Oscar) alone. She earned money by making and selling clothes in the family's hometown, as she was unable to work for a company.

Oscar is married to his childhood sweetheart, Ludmila, who is a Japanese Brazilian. They have been together since 2009. They were married in 2011. Oscar is a Catholic who prays before each game to relax and get confidence for the match. He started taking English classes when he moved to London and became neighbors with former teammate Juan Mata and retired midfielder Giorgos Karagounis upon his arrival at the club. Oscar and his wife have a daughter, Júlia, who was born in 2014, and son, Caio, who was born in 2016.

Career statistics

Club

International
As of 18 November 2015.
Appearances and goals by national team and year

Scores and results list Brazil's goal tally first.

Honours

Internacional
Recopa Sudamericana: 2011

Chelsea
Premier League: 2014–15
Football League Cup: 2014–15
UEFA Europa League: 2012–13

Shanghai SIPG
Chinese Super League: 2018
Chinese FA Super Cup: 2019
Brazil U20
South American Youth Football Championship: 2011
FIFA U-20 World Cup: 2011

Brazil U23
Summer Olympics Silver Medal: 2012

Brazil
FIFA Confederations Cup: 2013
Individual
FIFA World Cup All-Star Team: 2014
Chelsea Goal of the Year: 2012–13 vs. Juventus, 2014–15 vs. Queens Park Rangers
Chinese Super League Team of the Year: 2018
AFC Champions League OPTA Best XI: 2019

References

External links

1991 births
Living people
People from Americana, São Paulo
Association football midfielders
Brazilian footballers
Brazilian Roman Catholics
São Paulo FC players
Sport Club Internacional players
Chelsea F.C. players
Shanghai Port F.C. players
Campeonato Brasileiro Série A players
Premier League players
Chinese Super League players
UEFA Europa League winning players
Brazil youth international footballers
Brazil under-20 international footballers
Olympic footballers of Brazil
Brazil international footballers
Footballers at the 2012 Summer Olympics
2013 FIFA Confederations Cup players
2014 FIFA World Cup players
Medalists at the 2012 Summer Olympics
Olympic medalists in football
Olympic silver medalists for Brazil
FIFA Confederations Cup-winning players
Brazilian expatriate footballers
Brazilian expatriate sportspeople in England
Brazilian expatriate sportspeople in China
Expatriate footballers in England
Expatriate footballers in China
Footballers from São Paulo (state)